Andrzej Zieliński (born 14 October 1961) is a Polish actor. He appeared in more than forty films since 1985.

Selected filmography

References

External links 

1962 births
Living people
Polish male film actors
People from Tarnów